Kamares is a village in south-central Crete, Greece. It is the location of an archaeological site of a Minoan sacred cave.  The sacred cave at Kamares is slightly offset from a saddle in the Psiloriti Range virtually aligned with the location of nearby Phaistos.  Some of the best examples of Middle Minoan pottery have been recovered from the Kamares cave. Kamares has provided the type name for Kamares ware, a ceramic type dating from MM IA, or the First Palace Period. This pottery is a light-on-dark polychrome ware, with forms including jugs and cups.

See also

Hagia Triada

References

Minoan sites in Crete
Ancient caves of Greece
Populated places in Heraklion (regional unit)